Manuel Ortiz (July 2, 1916 – May 31, 1970) was an American professional boxer in the bantamweight division and one of the very best boxers of the 1940s, and was named to Ring Magazine's list of the 80 Best Fighters of the Last 80 Years. In 1996, he was inducted into the International Boxing Hall of Fame.

Amateur career
Ortiz, who was of Mexican descent, started an amateur career in 1937. Within a year, Ortiz won the Southern California Amateur Flyweight Title, the Golden Gloves Title, and the National AAU title in Boston. He also defeated Chief Lopez, who was an Olympic runner-up, and Bobby Hagar (father of former Van Halen frontman Sammy Hagar) twice. In their first fight, Ortiz decked Hagar 17 times. In their second match, Ortiz decked Hagar twenty times.

Professional career

Ortiz turned pro in 1938 and in 1942 won the World Bantamweight title by beating Lou Salica. He defended the title a division record of 15 times against 11 boxers before losing to Harold Dade in 1947. He regained the title in a rematch later in the year, and defended the title four more times giving him the most combined title defenses of any bantamweight champion in history at 19 title defenses. After losing his undisputed championship to the undefeated Vic Toweel in 1950, he went on to fight for 5 more years never getting a chance at an unprecedented third bantamweight title reign.

Outside the Ring
Ortiz made a very brief appearance in a gym scene in the 1947 movie Killer McCoy.
Ortiz served in the U.S. Army.
Ortiz died from cirrhosis of the liver after a long illness in 1970.
Ortiz is the very first boxer in the prominent boxing online database on BoxRec, having the Global ID number of simply "1".

Professional boxing record

See also
List of Mexican boxing world champions
List of world bantamweight boxing champions

References

External links
 
Manuel Ortiz - CBZ Profile

 https://titlehistories.com/boxing/wba/wba-world-b.html
 https://titlehistories.com/boxing/na/usa/ny/nysac-b.html
 https://boxrec.com/media/index.php/The_Ring_Magazine%27s_Annual_Ratings:_Bantamweight--1940s

1916 births
1970 deaths
American boxers of Mexican descent
Boxers from California
Bantamweight boxers
International Boxing Hall of Fame inductees
American male boxers
Sportspeople from Corona, California